Dimitri Kusnezov is an American physicist and academic who is the under secretary of homeland security for science and technology. He has published over 160 research papers and articles and has over 3600 citations according to Google Scholar.

Education 
Kusnezov earned Bachelor of Arts degrees in physics and pure mathematics from the University of California, Berkeley, a followed by a Master of Arts in physics from Princeton University and a PhD in theoretical and mathematical physics.

Career 
From 1991 to 2001, Kusnezov worked as an assistant and associate professor at Yale University. Kusnezov joined the National Nuclear Security Administration in 2001 and later served as a senior advisor to the secretary of the United States Department of Energy. Since February 2019, he has served as deputy under secretary of energy for AI and technology.

Selected publications 

 1999, D Kusnezov, A Bulgac, G Do Dang, Quantum levy processes and fractional kinetics, Physical review letters 82 (6), 1136
 1996, VP Antropov, MI Katsnelson, BN Harmon, M Van Schilfgaarde, Spin dynamics in magnets: Equation of motion and finite temperature effects, Physical Review B 54 (2), 1019
1990, D Kusnezov, A Bulgac, W Bauer, Canonical ensembles from chaos, Annals of Physics 204 (1), 155-185

References 

Living people
American physicists
University of California, Berkeley alumni
Princeton University alumni
Yale University faculty
United States Department of Energy officials
United States Department of Homeland Security officials
Year of birth missing (living people)
Biden administration personnel